The Clach nam Breatann (or Minvircc) is a large stone which marked the boundary between Dál Riata, Alt Clut and the homeland of the Picts in what is now Scotland .

The Stone still stands, on the slopes of Glen Falloch, between Crianlarich and Inverarnan.

There is another boundary stone in Ben Donich, called Clach A' Bhreatunnaich.

References

Scotland in the Early Middle Ages
Boundary markers